Lophonotidia is a genus of moths of the family Noctuidae. The genus was erected by George Hampson in 1901.

Species
 Lophonotidia melanoleuca Janse, 1937
 Lophonotidia nocturna Hampson, 1901

References

Agaristinae